Ottowia thiooxydans is a Gram-staining, facultatively anaerobic, N2O-producing and non-motile bacterium from the genus Ottowia which has been isolated from activated sludge from Munich in Germany.

References

Comamonadaceae
Bacteria described in 2004